T. Trilby, pseudonym of Thérèse de Marnyhac (July 12, 1875, Paris – November 11, 1962, La Rochelle), was a French novelist. She also used the pseudonyms Mme Louis Delhaye (her married name) and Marraine Odette.

Biography 
Her father was a merchant in Paris. She had a strict upbringing and education. During WWI, she was a nurse working for the Red Cross and received the Legion of Honour. When the war was over, she continued to work for the Red Cross and looked after young girls in difficulty.

In 1899, she married Louis Delhaye (b. 1868), an industrialist. They had a son.

She wrote novels, mainly for young people, as well as novels for young women.
 
Of an optimistic and enthusiastic nature, Trilby wished, through her writings, to transmit to children and young people the moral values which have been taught to her: admiration of the army, colonialist spirit, support of the Croix-de-Feu, hostility to  Popular Front (in  Bouboule chez les Croix-de-feu  (1936) and in  Bouboule et le Front populaire  (1937)).

Two of her novels earned awards from the Académie française:  Le Retour  (Prix Monition in 1920) and En avant. Le petit roi des forains (Prix Sobrier-Arnould in 1949).

Since 1993, the Éditions du Triomphe have reissued 35 of her works.

Paul Renard, author of L'Action française et la vie littéraire (1931-1944), described her as a romancière d'extrême droite (novelist of the far-right).

Selected publications

 1903 : Vicieuse
 1904 : Flirteuse
 1904 : Petites oies blanches
 1905 : Sans Dieu
 1906 : L'Assistée
 1910 : Odette de Lymaille, femme de lettres
 1910 : La Petiote
 1910 : Printemps perdu
 1912 : La Transfuge
 1917 : Arlette, jeune fille moderne
 1919 : Ninette infirmière
 1919 : Le Retour
 1921 : Rêve d'amour
 1922 : L'Impossible Rédemption
 1922 : L'Inutile sacrifice - Collection Stella 
 1922 : Le Mauvais Amour
 1924 : Zab et Zabeth
 1925 : Le Droit d'aimer
 1925 : Jacqueline, ou la Bonne action
 1925 : L'Incomprise
 1926 : La Roue du moulin - Collection Stella  (1926)
 1926 : Monique, poupée française, adapted for cinema in 1928 under the title La Faute de Monique
 1927 : Aimer, c'est pardonner
 1927 : La Jolie Bêtise
 1927 : Bouboule, ou Une cure à Vichy
 1928 : Amoureuse espérance
 1928 : Marie-Pierre au volant, ou la Grande aventure
 1928 : Une toute petite aventure
 1929 : Marise, fille de la liberté
 1929 : La Petite Parfumeuse
 1929 : Princesse de Riviera
 1930 : La Vie sentimentale de Mme Noiraude
 1931 : Bouboule, dame de la IIIe République
 1931 : Jacqueline, ou la Bonne action
 1931 : Deux cœurs
 1931 : Pantins et marionnettes
 1932 : Deux pigeons s'aimaient d'amour tendre
 1933 : Tour par amour
 1933 : Bouboule en Italie
 1933 : Bouboule à Genève
 1934 : Furette, ou la Rançon
 1935 : Bouboule dans la tourmente
 1935 : Fred, ou la Lune de miel
 1935 : Lulu le petit roi des forains
 1936 : Moineau, la petite libraire
 1936 : Bouboule chez les Croix de feu
 1936 : Fred, ou l'Amour et ses merveilles
 1936 : Dadou gosse de Paris 
 1937 : Poupoune au pays des navets
 1937 : Le Petit Roi malgré lui
 1937 : Bouboule et le Front populaire
 1938 : Des fleurs et un cœur
 1938 : Une sainte, des démons et Kiki
 1938 : Titi la Carotte et sa princesse
 1939 : D'un palais rose à une mansarde
 1939 : L'Exil sans retour
 1940 : Coco de France
 1941 : La Peur du rêve
 1941 : Le Grand Monsieur Poucet
 1942 : Le passé est ton maître
 1943 : Madame Carabosse
 1943 : Toujours plus haut
 1944 : La Petite Maréchale
 1945 : Totor et Cie
 1945 : À tout péché miséricorde
 1946 : La Grande Découverte
 1946 : Florette ou la Rivière des parfums
 1946 : Le Messager victorieux
 1947 : Louna la petite Chérifa
 1947 : Les Trois Lumières
 1948 : Fleuris où tu es semée
 1948 : En avant ! (Prix de l'Académie française)
 1948 : Lulu, le petit roi des forains (Prix de l'Académie française)
 1949 : Petites filles modernes
 1949 : La Princesse Mimosa
 1949 : Délivrez-nous du mal
 1949 : Mälasika, petit prince hindou
 1950 : Au clair de la lune
 1950 : Fantaisie en sol mineur
 1951 : L'Invitation au bonheur
 1951 : Le Petit Monsieur Vincent
 1952 : Vacances et Liberté
 1952 : Les Ravisseurs
 1953 : L'Amour et ses précieuses victimes
 1953 : Le Capitaine Gribouillard
 1954 : Boule d'or et sa dauphine
 1954 : Mais… l'amour vint 
 1954 : Il y a toujours un lendemain
 1954 : Princesse de rêve et d'infortune
 1955 : Cordon s'il vous plaît
 1955 : La Messe pour les jeunes
 1955 : Cœurs en grève
 1956 : Kounto et ses amis''''
 1956 : Donnez-moi la puissance d'aimer 1956 : La Grande Patronne 
 1956 : Paris-Londres 1957 : Il était un petit chat, conte moderne 1957 : La Maison sans âme 1957 : Savoir aimer 1957 : Riki demoiselle de la légion d'honneur 1958 : Les Associés du petit Noël 1958 : Pique-la-Lune 1958 : Risque-Tout, Président du Conseil 1959 : La Princesse héritière  1959 : Marion la Vedette 1960 : Leurs excellences Zoupi et Zoupinette 1960 : Une vie, un rêve 1961 : Casse-Cou ou la miraculeuse aventure Sources 
 Trilby, un auteur à succès pour la jeunesse, Karine-Marie Voyer, Éditions du Triomphe, 1997, broché, 93 p., .
 Grand annuaire des littérateurs, des compositeurs de musique et des artistes peintres et sculpteurs'', Paris, J. Denolly, 1922.
 .
  Bibliothèque nationale de France (See "Accès au catalogue général de la BnF".)
 Biographie de T. Trilby

References

External links
Parisienne 1914 - Infirmière 1915 Un texte de T. Trilby
bibliographie de T. Trilby
Les Éditions du Triomphe réédite des romans de T. Trilby

1875 births
1962 deaths
French writers of young adult literature
French romantic fiction writers
Women romantic fiction writers
20th-century French novelists
Pseudonymous women writers
20th-century French women writers
20th-century pseudonymous writers